The Maurice Farman MF.9 is a French tourism biplane developed by Maurice Farman before World War I. Like the Maurice Farman MF.6, it used floats for take-off and landing on water.

Specifications

References

Further reading
 

 

Biplanes
Single-engined pusher aircraft
MF.09
Canard aircraft